A number of lakes in Minnesota are called Cedar Lake:

 Cedar Lake (Minneapolis)
 Cedar Lake (Aitkin County, Minnesota)
 Cedar Lake (Martin County, Minnesota)
 Cedar Lake (McLeod and Meeker counties, Minnesota)
 Cedar Lake, a lake in Rice County, Minnesota
 Cedar Lake (Scott County, Minnesota)

See also
 Cedar Lake (disambiguation)